John Ambrose "Jack" MacKell (December 4, 1894 – November 25, 1961) was a Canadian professional hockey player who played two seasons in the National Hockey League (NHL) for the Ottawa Senators between 1919 and 1921. He was born in Ottawa, Ontario.

Playing career
MacKell played for several seasons in the Ottawa City Hockey League before joining the Senators in 1919. He played 45 games over two seasons in the National Hockey League with the Ottawa Senators before returning Ottawa City League where he played two more seasons before retirement. His son Fleming Mackell also played in the NHL.

Career statistics

Regular season and playoffs

Achievements
 1920 - Stanley Cup champion
 1921 - Stanley Cup champion

External links
 

1894 births
1961 deaths
Canadian ice hockey defencemen
Canadian ice hockey right wingers
Ice hockey people from Ottawa
Ottawa Senators (1917) players
Stanley Cup champions